Tisovec is a municipality and village in Chrudim District in the Pardubice Region of the Czech Republic. It has about 300 inhabitants.

Administrative parts
Villages of Dřeveš, Kvasín, Otáňka and Vrbětice are administrative parts of Tisovec.

References

External links

Villages in Chrudim District